Phreatia, commonly known as lace orchids, is a genus of flowering plants from the orchid family, Orchidaceae, native to regions bordering the Pacific and Indian Oceans. Plants in this genus are epiphytes, sometimes with pseudobulbs, in which case there are usually one or two leaves. Others lack pseudobulbs but have up to twelve leaves. A large number of small white or greenish flowers are borne on a flowering stem emerging from a leaf axil or from the base of the pseudobulb when present but the flowers do not open widely. There are about 220 species, distributed from tropical and subtropical Asia to the Pacific.

Description
Orchids in the genus Phratia are epiphytic herbs similar to those in the genus Thelasis and sometimes have pseudobulbs with one or two leaves or otherwise lack pseudobulbs and have up to twelve leaves. A large number of small flowers are arranged on a flowering stem that emerges from the top of the pseudobulb when present or from a leaf axil. The flowers are resupinate, usually white or greenish and do not open widely. The sepals and petals are free from and similar to each other, but the petals are slightly smaller. The lateral sepals form a small ledge or "mentum" with the base of the column. There is sometimes a sac-like structure at the base of the labellum.

Taxonomy and naming
The genus Phreatia was first formally described in 1830 by John Lindley and the description was published in his book The Genera and Species of Orchidaceous Plants. The name Phreatia is derived from the Ancient Greek word phreatos meaning "a well" or "reservoir".

Species list
The following is a list of Phreatia species accepted by the World Checklist of Selected Plant Families as at January 2019:
 
 Phreatia acuminata J.J.Sm.
 Phreatia albiflora Ridl.
 Phreatia albofarinosa Ormerod
 Phreatia alpina J.J.Sm.
 Phreatia altigena Schltr. in K.M.Schumann & C.A.G.Lauterbach
 Phreatia amabilis P.Royen
 Phreatia amesii Kraenzl.
 Phreatia angustifolia Schltr.,
 Phreatia aristulifera Ames
 Phreatia asciiformis J.J.Sm.
 Phreatia beiningiana Schltr. in K.M.Schumann & C.A.G.Lauterbach
 Phreatia bicallosa Ridl.
 Phreatia bicostata J.J.Sm.
 Phreatia biechinata Ormerod
 Phreatia bigibbosa J.J.Sm.
 Phreatia bigibbula Kores
 Phreatia bismarckiensis Schltr.
 Phreatia brachyphylla Schltr.
 Phreatia brachyphyton Schltr.
 Phreatia brachystachys Schltr. in K.M.Schumann & C.A.G.Lauterbach
 Phreatia bracteata Schltr. in K.M.Schumann & C.A.G.Lauterbach
 Phreatia brevicaulis Schltr.
 Phreatia brevis Schltr.
 Phreatia breviscapa J.J.Sm.
 Phreatia bulbophylloides Schltr.
 Phreatia caespitosa J.J.Sm.
 Phreatia calcarata J.J.Sm.
 Phreatia canaliculata J.J.Sm.
 Phreatia carolinensis Schltr.
 Phreatia caudata Schltr.
 Phreatia caudata var. caudata
 Phreatia caudata var. tenuissima Schltr.
 Phreatia caudiflora Gilli
 Phreatia caulescens Ames
 Phreatia chionantha Schltr.
 Phreatia coelonychia Schltr.
 Phreatia collina J.J.Sm.
 Phreatia concinna Ridl.
 Phreatia constricta Schltr.
 Phreatia crassifolia Ridl.
 Phreatia crassiuscula Nicholls – green caterpillar orchid
 Phreatia crinonioides Schltr.
 Phreatia cryptostigma Schltr.
 Phreatia cucullata J.J.Sm.
 Phreatia curvata (Gilli) Ormerod
 Phreatia cylindrostachya Schltr.
 Phreatia cylindrostachya var. cylindrostachya
 Phreatia cylindrostachya var. grandifolia Schltr.
 Phreatia deltoides J.J.Sm.
 Phreatia dendrochiloides Schltr.
 Phreatia dendrophylax (Rchb.f.) Kraenzl. in H.G.A.Engler (ed.)
 Phreatia densiflora (Blume) Lindl.
 Phreatia densiflora var. densiflora
 Phreatia densiflora var. vietnamensis Aver.
 Phreatia densispica Ridl.
 Phreatia densissima J.J.Sm.
 Phreatia dischorensis Schltr.
 Phreatia djamuensis Schltr.
 Phreatia dulcis J.J.Sm.
 Phreatia elata Schltr.
 Phreatia elegans Lindl.
 Phreatia elongata Schltr.
 Phreatia epimonticola J.M.H.Shaw
 Phreatia falcata Ridl.
 Phreatia finisterrae Schltr.
 Phreatia flaccida Ridl.
 Phreatia flavovirens Kores
 Phreatia formosana Rolfe ex Hemsl.
 Phreatia formosana var. continentalis Aver.
 Phreatia formosana var. formosana
 Phreatia foveata Carr
 Phreatia ganggapensis P.Royen
 Phreatia gillespiei Kores
 Phreatia giluwensis Ormerod
 Phreatia gladiata (A.Rich.) Lindl.
 Phreatia goliathensis J.J.Sm.
 Phreatia goodspeediana A.D.Hawkes
 Phreatia govidjoae Schltr.
 Phreatia gracilis Schltr.
 Phreatia grandiflora J.J.Sm.
 Phreatia habbemae J.J.Sm.
 Phreatia hartleyi Ormerod
 Phreatia hollandiana J.J.Sm.
 Phreatia hypsorrhynchos Schltr.
 Phreatia imitans Schltr.
 Phreatia infundibuliformis Ames
 Phreatia iridifolia Schltr.
 Phreatia jadunae Schltr.
 Phreatia jayaweerae Ormerod
 Phreatia kaindiensis Ormerod
 Phreatia kanehirae Fukuy.
 Phreatia kaniensis Schltr.
 Phreatia kempfii Schltr.
 Phreatia kempteri Schltr.
 Phreatia keysseri Schltr.
 Phreatia klabatensis Schltr.
 Phreatia klossii Ridl.
 Phreatia koordersii Rolfe
 Phreatia kusaiensis Tuyama
 Phreatia ladronica Tuyama
 Phreatia lalana Ormerod
 Phreatia lasioglossa Schltr.
 Phreatia latipetala J.J.Sm.
 Phreatia laxa Schltr. in K.M.Schumann & C.A.G.Lauterbach
 Phreatia laxa var. laxa
 Phreatia laxa var. perlaxa Schltr.
 Phreatia laxiflora (Blume) Lindl.
 Phreatia leioglossa Schltr.
 Phreatia leptophylla Schltr.
 Phreatia leucostachya Schltr.
 Phreatia limenophylax (Endl.) Rchb.f. – Norfolk Island caterpillar orchid
 Phreatia linearifolia Schltr. in K.M.Schumann & C.A.G.Lauterbach
 Phreatia linearis Ridl.
 Phreatia listeri Rolfe – Christmas Island caterpillar orchid
 Phreatia listrophora Ridl.
 Phreatia longibractea Schltr.
 Phreatia longibracteata Ridl.
 Phreatia longicaulis Schltr. in K.M.Schumann & C.A.G.Lauterbach
 Phreatia longimentum Gilli
 Phreatia loriae Schltr.
 Phreatia louisiadum Kraenzl. in H.G.A.Engler (ed.)
 Phreatia luzoniensis Rolfe ex Ames
 Phreatia macra Schltr.
 Phreatia masarangica Schltr.
 Phreatia matthewsii Rchb.f.
 Phreatia maxima Kraenzl. in H.G.A.Engler (ed.)
 Phreatia mearnsii Ames
 Phreatia mentosa  Schltr.
 Phreatia micholitzii Schltr.
 Phreatia micrantha (A.Rich.) Lindl. – native fan orchid
 Phreatia microphyton Schltr.
 Phreatia microtatantha Schltr.
 Phreatia millikenii Ormerod
 Phreatia minahassae Schltr.
 Phreatia minima Schltr.
 Phreatia minutiflora Lindl.
 Phreatia modesta Ridl.
 Phreatia moluccana J.J.Sm.
 Phreatia montana Ridl.
 Phreatia monticola Schltr.
 Phreatia monticola var. minor Schltr.
 Phreatia monticola var. monticola
 Phreatia morii Hayata
 Phreatia muscicola P.Royen
 Phreatia myriantha Schltr.
 Phreatia navicularis J.J.Sm.
 Phreatia nebularum Schltr.
 Phreatia negrosiana Ames
 Phreatia nutans J.J.Sm.
 Phreatia oreogena Schltr.
 Phreatia oreophylax Rchb.f.
 Phreatia oxyantheroides Schltr. in K.M.Schumann & C.A.G.Lauterbach
 Phreatia pacifica Fukuy.
 Phreatia padangensis Schltr.
 Phreatia palawensis (Schltr.) Tuyama
 Phreatia paleata (Rchb.f.) Rchb.f. – white lace orchid
 Phreatia palmifrons Ormerod
 Phreatia papuana Ridl.
 Phreatia pentagona Kores
 Phreatia petiolata Schltr. in K.M.Schumann & C.A.G.Lauterbach
 Phreatia petiolata var. eitapensis Schltr.
 Phreatia petiolata var. petiolata
 Phreatia pholidotoides Schltr.
 Phreatia phreatioides (J.J.Sm.) L.O.Williams
 Phreatia pisifera J.J.Sm.
 Phreatia plagiopetala Schltr.
 Phreatia plantaginifolia (J.Koenig) Ormerod
 Phreatia platychila (Kraenzl.) Schltr. in K.M.Schumann & C.A.G.Lauterbach
 Phreatia platyclinoides Ridl.
 Phreatia pleistantha Schltr.
 Phreatia plexauroides Rchb.f.
 Phreatia polyantha Schltr.
 Phreatia potamophila Schltr.
 Phreatia procera Ridl.
 Phreatia protensa Schltr.
 Phreatia pseudothompsonii Tuyama
 Phreatia pulchella Ridl.
 Phreatia pumilio Schltr.
 Phreatia pusilla (F.M.Bailey) Rolfe nom. illeg.
 Phreatia pusilla (Blume) Lindl.
 Phreatia quadrata Schltr.
 Phreatia quinquelobulata J.J.Sm.
 Phreatia ramosii Ames
 Phreatia renilabris J.J.Sm.
 Phreatia repens J.J.Sm.
 Phreatia resiana J.J.Sm.
 Phreatia rhomboglossa Schltr. in K.M.Schumann & C.A.G.Lauterbach
 Phreatia rotundata J.J.Sm.
 Phreatia rupestris J.J.Sm.
 Phreatia ryozoana Tuyama
 Phreatia saccifera Schltr. in K.M.Schumann & C.A.G.Lauterbach
 Phreatia sarasinorum Kraenzl. in H.G.A.Engler (ed.)
 Phreatia sarawaketensis Ormerod
 Phreatia scandens J.J.Sm.
 Phreatia scaphioglossa Schltr. in K.M.Schumann & C.A.G.Lauterbach
 Phreatia schoenorchis J.J.Sm.
 Phreatia seleniglossa Schltr.
 Phreatia semiorbicularis J.J.Sm.
 Phreatia semiorbicularis var. angiensis J.J.Sm.
 Phreatia semiorbicularis var. semiorbicularis
 Phreatia semiorbicularis var. seramica J.J.Sm.
 Phreatia seranica J.J.Sm.
 Phreatia similis Schltr.
 Phreatia simplex Schltr.
 Phreatia sinadjiensis J.J.Sm.
 Phreatia sororia Schltr.
 Phreatia sororia var. kenejiana Schltr.
 Phreatia sororia var. litoralis]  Schltr.
 Phreatia sororia var. sororia
 Phreatia spathilabia Schltr.
 Phreatia spathulata J.J.Sm. in L.S.Gibbs
 Phreatia sphaerocarpa Schltr. in K.M.Schumann & C.A.G.Lauterbach
 Phreatia stenophylla Schltr.
 Phreatia stenostachya (Rchb.f.) Kraenzl. in H.G.A.Engler (ed.)
 Phreatia stipulata Schltr.
 Phreatia stresemannii J.J.Sm.
 Phreatia subalpina P.Royen
 Phreatia subcrenulata Schltr.
 Phreatia sublata N.Hallé
 Phreatia subsaccata J.J.Sm.
 Phreatia subsacculata Schltr.
 Phreatia subtriloba Schltr.
 Phreatia sulcata (Blume) J.J.Sm.
 Phreatia sumatrana Schltr.
 Phreatia tafana Ormerod
 Phreatia tahitensis Lindl.
 Phreatia taiwaniana Fukuy.
 Phreatia tenuis Schltr.
 Phreatia teretifolia (Gilli) Ormerod
 Phreatia thompsonii Ames
 Phreatia tjibodasana J.J.Sm.
 Phreatia transversiloba Schltr.
 Phreatia trilobulata Schltr.
 Phreatia urostachya Schltr.
 Phreatia vaginata Schltr.
 Phreatia valida Schltr. in K.M.Schumann & C.A.G.Lauterbach
 Phreatia vandenbergiae Ormerod
 Phreatia vanimoana Ormerod
 Phreatia vanoverberghii Ames
 Phreatia vanuatensis T.Yukawa
 Phreatia virescens Schltr.
 Phreatia wenzelii Ames
 Phreatia xantholeuca Kraenzl.

Distribution
Orchids in the genus Phreatia are found in China, Taiwan, the Indian Subcontinent, the Andaman Islands, Thailand, Vietnam, Borneo, Java, the Lesser Sunda Islands, Peninsular Malaysia, the Maluku Islands, the Philippines, Sulawesi, Sumatra, Christmas Island, the Bismarck Archipelago, New Guinea, the Solomon Islands, Norfolk Island, Queensland (Australia), Fiji, Niue, New Caledonia, Samoa, the Santa Cruz Islands, Tonga, Vanuatu, Wallis and Futuna Islands, the Society Islands, the Caroline Islands and the Mariana Islands.

References

External links

 
Podochileae genera